William C. Rauschenberger (December 6, 1855 – April 6, 1918) was a Republican politician who served as mayor of Milwaukee, Wisconsin.

Rauschenberger was born in Soldin, Prussia, to John and Amalie Rauschenberger in 1855; they moved to Wisconsin in 1860. William Rauschenberger held a number of offices in Milwaukee, including alderman, school commissioner, president of the school board, and president of the Common Council. He was elected mayor in 1896 and served a two-year term.

As Common Council President, he dedicated the finished Milwaukee City Hall.

References

Men of Progress, Wisconsin. 1897, pages 52–53. Retrieved 6 May 29  from 

1855 births
1918 deaths
People from Myślibórz
People from the Province of Brandenburg
German emigrants to the United States
Wisconsin Republicans
Mayors of Milwaukee
Milwaukee Common Council members
School board members in Wisconsin
19th-century American politicians